Pseudognathobotys is a genus of moths of the family Crambidae. They are found in the Afrotropical region, having been first discovered in 2001.

Species
Pseudognathobotys africalis Maes, 2001
Pseudognathobotys diffusalis Maes, 2001

References

Spilomelinae
Crambidae genera